NWS may refer to:
National Weather Service, a U.S. government agency charged with issuing weather forecasts, advisories, watches, and warnings on a daily basis
National Woolsorters' Society, a former British trade union
News Corporation's NASDAQ ticker symbol for Class B stock
NWS (TV station), a television station in Adelaide, South Australia
Nuclear Weapons State, a term relating to the U.S., Russia, China, United Kingdom and France in the Nuclear Non-Proliferation Treaty
Not work safe, a web acronym interchangeable with the more widespread NSFW ("not safe for work")
Netherlands Worldwide Students, a worldwide network of Dutch students enrolled in foreign universities
North Warning System, a series of radar stations across Arctic North America
Nintendo World Store, Nintendo's showcase store in New York City
NWS Holdings, a listed company in Hong Kong
North Wilkesboro Speedway, a track that was the site of NASCAR Sprint Cup Series racing until closing in 1996, the track reopened in 2010 and will hold a USARacing event.
Northwest Semitic languages, a branch of the Afro-Asiatic language family